Alf Wilhelm Lundberg (born 8 May 1979 in Haugesund, Norway) is a Norwegian Jazz musician (guitar and piano) and composer.

Career 
Lundberg studied music on the Jazz program at Trondheim Musikkonsevatorium, where he earned specialization in arranging and composition. In 2003 Lundberg was awarded the first prize at the "Umbria Jazz Clinics" in Italia as guitarist in a strong competition. He has subsequently also studied guitar under the guidance of Adam Rogers in New York and Nelson Veras in Paris.

Lundberg has toured England, Poland, Sweden, Finland, Italy and France with bands "All Strings Trio", "Faces" and "Kofi/Makowski Quartet", and played on some of the biggest jazz festivals in Europe, like Kongsberg Jazzfestival, London Jazz Festival and Umbria Jazz. He has also won Sildajazzprisen and the "Haugesund Kommunes Kulturstipend" in 2004. Has been described as one of the best guitarists in Norway and has been compared to jazz and classical giants like Egberto Gismonti, Keith Jarrett and Andrés Segovia by Norwegian reviewers.

Honors
2003: First prize at the "Umbria Jazz Clinics" in Italia as guitarist
2004: Sildajazzprisen

Discography 
1999: Aroma, within "Aroma»
2008: Norchestra, within "Norchestra»
2010: Alle E Aleina, with Jan Toft

References

External links 

20th-century Norwegian guitarists
21st-century Norwegian guitarists
Norwegian jazz guitarists
Norwegian jazz composers
Male jazz composers
Norwegian University of Science and Technology alumni
Musicians from Haugesund
1979 births
Living people
20th-century guitarists
20th-century Norwegian male musicians
21st-century Norwegian male musicians